Raymond Herbert Stetson (died 4 December 1950) was an American speech scientist at Oberlin College.  In 1928 he published an influential book called Motor Phonetics: A Study of Speech Movements in Action. He is the one who developed the chest pulses theory in the study of English syllables; the number of syllables is determined in the number of chest pulses.  He graduated from Harvard University and Oberlin College.

References

Year of birth missing
1950 deaths
Oberlin College alumni
Harvard University alumni
Linguists from the United States